Manuel Berzal Burgos (born February 16, 1962, in Madrid) is a wheelchair basketball athlete from Spain.  He has a physical disability: he is 4.5 point wheelchair basketball player. He played wheelchair basketball at the 1996 Summer Paralympics. His team was fourth.

References 

Wheelchair category Paralympic competitors
Spanish men's wheelchair basketball players
Paralympic wheelchair basketball players of Spain
Living people
1962 births
Basketball players from Madrid
Wheelchair basketball players at the 1996 Summer Paralympics
20th-century Spanish people